Robert Charles Zimmerman (January 5, 1910January 17, 1996) was an American government administrator and Republican politician.  He was the 27th secretary of state of Wisconsin, serving from 1957 to 1975.  His father was Fred R. Zimmerman, the 25th governor of Wisconsin and the 22nd & 24th secretary of state of Wisconsin.

Biography
Robert Zimmerman was born in the town of Lake, in Milwaukee County, Wisconsin.  The town of Lake no longer exists, and was mostly annexed into the city of Milwaukee in 1954.  As a child, he moved with his family to Madison, Wisconsin, where his father was serving as secretary of state.  He graduated from Madison Central High School.

When his father returned to the secretary of state's office in 1939, he hired Robert as a private secretary.  In 1940, he appointed his son assistant secretary of state.

In January 1941, he was drafted into the United States Army, he served about 8 months and was then discharged in September 1941, when men over age 28 were exempted.  He returned, briefly, to his job as assistant secretary of state, but after the attack on Pearl Harbor in December 1941, he was called back to service in the Army.  He was promoted to corporal in June 1942, and was later promoted to sergeant.  He spent his entire service at various bases in the continental United States, he was discharged due to disability in September 1943.

After returning from the Army, Zimmerman resumed his office as assistant secretary of state.  He served in that role until his father's death in December 1954.  In the November 1954 election, Robert was largely responsible for campaigning on behalf of his father, who was in poor health for most of the last years of his life after suffering a stroke.

Governor Walter J. Kohler, Jr., appointed statistician Glenn M. Wise to fill the 1955–1956 term as secretary of state.  In the 1956 election, Zimmerman launched a primary challenge against Wise, and prevailed with 57% of the vote.  He went on to win the general election with 58% of the vote.  He went on to win re-election eight times, serving eight two-year terms and one four-year term.  He announced in January 1974 that he would not run for another term and would retire.  Between Zimmerman and his father, they controlled the secretary of state's office for 38 years.

Personal life and family
Robert Zimmerman was the older of two sons born to Fred R. Zimmerman and his wife Amanda ( Freedy) Zimmerman.  Fred Zimmerman was a prominent Wisconsin Republican, he served ten terms (20 years) as secretary of state of Wisconsin, and served one term as governor of Wisconsin.  He famously clashed with Republican U.S. senator Joseph McCarthy.  Robert's younger brother, Frederick, also served in the Army during World War II.

Robert Zimmerman married Dorothy F. McCurdy of Madison, Wisconsin, on October 17, 1941.  She died of cancer in 1978.  They had no children.

Robert Zimmerman died at St. Mary's Hospital in Madison on January 17, 1996, just after his 86th birthday.

Electoral history

Wisconsin Secretary of State (1956–1970)

References

1910 births
1996 deaths
Politicians from Milwaukee
Secretaries of State of Wisconsin
20th-century American politicians